Krisha Fairchild is an American actress, best known for starring in her nephew Trey Edward Shults' critically acclaimed film Krisha (2015). She is also known for her role as Louise Lispector in Syfy's horror anthology series Channel Zero: Butcher's Block.

Filmography

Film

Television

Video games

Awards and nominations

References

External links 
 

American actresses
Living people
1951 births
21st-century American women